Swift J1818.0–1607 is a young magnetar and soft gamma repeater, with an estimated age between 240 and 500 years. It was discovered by NASA's Neil Gehrels Swift Observatory when it exhibited an X-ray burst on 12 March 2020.

References

External links 
 A Cosmic Baby Is Discovered, and It's Brilliant, Calla Cofield, NASA, 17 June 2020
 XMM-Newton observes baby magnetar, ESA, 17 June 2020
 J1818.0-1607: Chandra Studies Extraordinary Magnetar, Chandra X-ray Center, 8 January 2021

Magnetars
Sagittarius (constellation)
Astronomical X-ray sources
Soft gamma repeaters
20200312